Eostegostoma is an extinct genus of prehistoric cartilaginous fish from the Eocene epoch of Belgium.

References

Eocene sharks
Fossils of Belgium